Clement Henry Matthews (1889 – 15 August 1915) was an English professional footballer who played in the Southern Football League for Brighton & Hove Albion.

Personal life
Matthews worked as a bricklayer in Horsham. He served as a private in the Royal Sussex Regiment during the First World War and was shot and killed by a sniper at Suvla Bay, Gallipoli on 15 August 1915. He is buried at Green Hill Commonwealth War Graves Commission Cemetery.

References

1889 births
1915 deaths
Sportspeople from East Sussex
Association footballers not categorized by position
English footballers
Southern Football League players
Horsham F.C. players
Brighton & Hove Albion F.C. players
British Army personnel of World War I
Royal Sussex Regiment soldiers
British military personnel killed in World War I
British bricklayers
Burials at Green Hill Commonwealth War Graves Commission Cemetery
Deaths by firearm in Turkey
Military personnel from Sussex